Hakuyo Maru (Japanese: 白鷹丸) was a Ministry of Agriculture and Forestry fisheries inspection and observation ship that was requisitioned by the Imperial Japanese Navy during World War II for service primarily as an auxiliary survey vessel but later as a submarine chaser, cargo ship, and patrol boat.

History
She was laid down on 15 December 1928 by the Kawasaki Shipyard Co., Ltd. (株式會社川崎造船所) at the behest of the Ministry of Agriculture and Forestry (農林省). She was launched on 6 August 1929, completed on 12 November 1929, and registered in Tokyo. The Lloyd's registry lists her as Hakuyo Maru but some western sources list her as Shirataka Maru apparently due to a different translation of her name in kanji.

On 15 September 1942, she was requisitioned by the Imperial Japanese Navy as a survey vessel tasked with taking soundings in the South China Sea and the Java Sea. On 14 December 1943, she briefly served as a cargo ship on the Truk to Rabaul route. On 1 February 1944, she was designated as a submarine chaser and reassigned to the Yokosuka Defense Force, Yokosuka Naval District. She was struck from the Navy List on 30 November 1945.

References

1929 ships
Auxiliary ships of the Imperial Japanese Navy
Ships built by Kawasaki Heavy Industries
Maritime incidents in March 1945
Ships sunk by American submarines